Roman Osipovich Rosdolsky ( Roman Osipovič Rozdol's'kyj) (Lemberg, July 19, 1898 – Detroit, October 20, 1967) was a prominent Ukrainian Marxian scholar, historian and political theorist. Rodolsky's book The Making of Marx's Capital, became a foundational text in the rediscovery of Marx critique of political economy. As well as influenced later scholars such as Moishe Postone.

Biography 
Roman Rosdolsky was born in Lemberg (Lviv) in Galicia, at that time in the Austro-Hungarian empire, now in Ukraine, and died in Detroit, MI (USA). Rosdolsky's father Osyp Rosdolsky was a Ukrainian theologian, philologist, ethnographer, and translator of some repute. Roman's uncle was Ukrainian composer Danylo Rosdolsky. Both Roman's grandparents were priests of the Greek Catholic Church and well-known supporters of the independence of the Ukrainian nation. Ivan Franko was a family friend.

As a youth, Rosdolsky was a member of the Ukrainian socialist Drahomanov Circles. He was drafted in the imperial army in 1915, and edited with Roman Turiansky the journal Klyči in 1917. He was a founder of the International Revolutionary Social Democracy (IRSD) and studied law in Prague. During World War I he founded the antimilitaristic "Internationale Revolutionäre Sozialistische Jugend Galiziens" (International Revolutionary Socialist Youth of Galizia). He became a member of the Central Committee of the Communist Party of Eastern Galicia, representing its émigré organization 1921-1924 and a leading publicist of the Vasylkivtsi faction of the Ukrainian Communists. In 1925, he refused to condemn Trotsky and his Left Opposition, and was later, at the end of the 1920s, expelled from the Communist Party.

In 1926-1931, he was correspondent in Vienna of the Marx-Engels Institute in Moscow, searching for archival materials. At that time, in 1927, he met his wife Emily. When the labour movement in Austria suffered repression, he emigrated in 1934 back to L'viv, where he worked at the university as lecturer and he published the Trotskyist periodical Žittja i slovo 1934-1938. He was arrested by the Gestapo in 1942, but survived internment for three years in the concentration camps of Auschwitz, Ravensbrück and Oranienburg. He emigrated to the USA in 1947, and worked there as independent scholar - failing to obtain a university post. He published also under pseudonyms such as "Roman Prokopovycz", "P.Suk.", "Tenet" and "W.S.".

Rosdolsky is mainly known in the English-speaking world for his careful scholarly exegesis on Marx's Grundrisse, The Making of Marx's Capital. The collection of essays overturned many previous interpretations of Das Kapital. Yet he published much more, especially on historical topics. During his life, he corresponded with numerous well known Marxist writers including Isaac Deutscher, Ernest Mandel, Paul Mattick, and Karl Korsch. Mandel called Rosdolsky's work on the National Question the only Marxist criticism of Marx himself.

Main published works in English 
 1951 "The Distribution of the Agrarian Product in Feudalism", in: Journal of Economic History (1951), pp. 247–265 
 1952 "On the nature of peasant serfdom in Central and Eastern Europe", in: Journal of Central European Affairs, Vol. 12, 1952.
 1963 "A Revolutionary Parable on the Equality of Men", in: Archiv für Sozialgeschichte, Bd. 3 (1963), pp. 291–293.
 1965 "Worker and Fatherland: a Note on a Passage in the Communist Manifesto". Science & Society, Vol. 29, 1965, pp. 330–337 (reprinted in Bob Jessop & Dennis Wheatley (ed.), Karl Marx's social and political thought. London: Routledge, 1999).
 1974 "Method of Marx's Capital". New German Critique, Number 3, Fall 1974.
 1977 The Making of Marx's Capital. London: Pluto Press, 1977.
 1986 Engels and the `Nonhistoric' Peoples: the National Question in the Revolution of 1848. Glasgow: Critique books, 1987. First published in Critique, No.18/19, 1986.
 1988 "A Memoir of Auschwitz and Birkenau." (Introd. John-Paul Himka). Monthly Review Vol. 39, no. 8 (January 1988), pp. 33–38. 
 1999 Lenin and the First World War. London: Prinkipo Press, 1999.
 2009 "The Jewish Orphanage in Cracow". In: The Online Publications Series of the Center for Urban History of East Central Europe [www.lvivcenter.org/download.php?downloadid=107], No. 4, Lviv, October 2009 (translated by Diana Rosdolsky)

Published writing in German 
 1937 "Karl Marx und der Polizeispitzel Bangya, in: International Review for Social History", Vol. 2, Leyden 1937, pp. 229–245.
 1938 "Die Geschichte der tschechisch-polnischen Beziehungen in der ersten Hälfte des 19. Jahrhunderts", in: [Prager Rundschau, Jg. 8 (1938)], pp. 114–140.
 1948 "Das jüdische Waisenhaus in Krakau". In: Arbeiter Zeitung, Vienna, 15 April 1948.
 1954 "Die ostgalizische Dorfgemeinschaft und ihre Auflösung". In: Vierteljahrschrift für Sozial- und Wirtschaftsgeschichte. Franz Steiner Verlag, Vol. 41, Nr. 2, 1954, pp. 97–145. 
 1956 "Zur neueren Kritik des Marxschen Gesetzes der fallenden Profitrate", in: Kyklos, 2 (1956), pp. 208–226
 1957 Review of Martin Trottmann, Zur Interpretation und Kritik der Zusammenbruchstheorie von Henryk Grossmann, in: Kyklos, 3 (1957), pp. 353–355.
 1957 "Der esoterische und der exoterische Marx. Zur kritischen Würdigung der Marxschen Lohntheorie I–III", in: Arbeit und Wirtschaft, Vol. 11 (1957), Nr. 11ff., pp. pp. 348–351, 388–391, 20–24. 
 1959 Der Gebrauchswert bei Karl Marx. Eine Kritik der bisherigen Marx-Interpretation, Kyklos. Internationale Zeitschrift für Sozialwissenschaften, Vol. XII 1959, Basel, pp. 27–56. 
 1959 "Joan Robinsons Marx-Kritik", in: Arbeit und Wirtschaft, Vol. 13 (1959), Nr. 8f., pp. 178–183, 210–212. 
 1959 'Zur Analyse der russischen Revolution', in Die Sozialismusdebatte. Historische und aktuelle Fragen des Sozialismus, edited by Ulf Wolter, West Berlin: Olle & Wolter, 1978: 203-36. 
 1961 Die grosse Steuer- und Agrarreform Josefs II. Ein Kapitel zur österreichischen Wirtschaftsgeschichte. Warsaw: Panstwowe Wydawnictwo Naukowe, 1961.
 1963 "Archivalische Miszellen über O. Bauer". International Review of Social History, vol. 8(1963), pp. 436–446.
 1963 "La Neue Rheinische Zeitung et les Juifs", in: Etudes de Marxologie, no.7 (Aug. 1963).
 1963 "Ein neomarxistisches Lehrbuch der politischen Ökonomie", in: Kyklos. Internationale Zeitschrift für Sozialwissenschaften, Vol. XVI, 1963, pp. 626–654. 
 1963 "Archivalische Miszellen über Otto Bauer". In: International Review of Social History, Vol. 8, pp. 436–446, 1963.
 1963 "K. Marx und ein "Privatsekretär" Th. Sanders". International Review of Social History vol. 8(1963), pp. 282–285.
 1963 "Archivalische Miszellen über Otto Bauer". In: International Review of Social History, Vol. 8, pp. 436–446, 1963.
 1963 (Review) "Alfred Schmidt, Der Begriff der Natur in der Lehre von Marx". In: Schweizer Zeitschrift für Volkswirtschaft und Statistik, pp. 524–527, 1963.
 1965 "Die Rolle des Zufalls und der "Grossen Männer" in der Geschichte" (1965) . Kritik, Vol 5, No. 14, 1977, p. 67-96, Verlag Olle & Wolter, ISSN 0170-4761.
 1966 "Die serbische Sozialdemokratie und die Stockholmer Konferenz von 1917", in: Archiv für Sozialgeschichte, Vol. 6-7(1966–67), pp. 583–597.
 1968 "Einige Bemerkungen über die Methode des Marxschen "Kapitals" und ihre Bedeutung für die heutige Marxforschung". In: Kritik der politischen Ökonomie heute. 100 Jahre "Kapital". Frankfurt, Europäische Verlagsanstalt, pp. 9–21, 1968.
 1969 "Der Streit um die polnisch-russischen Staatsgrenzen anlässlich des polnischen Aufstandes von 1863", in: Archiv für Sozialgeschichte, Vol. 9(1969), pp. 157–180. 
 1973 Studien über revolutionäre Taktik : 2 unveröffentlichte Arbeiten über d. 2. Internationale u. d. österr. Sozialdemokratie. With comments about the author and the edited texts by Emily Rosdolsky. Berlin : Verlag für d. Studium d. Arbeiterbewegung, 1973.
 1976 Die Bauernabgeordneten im konstituierenden österreichischen Reichstag 1848 - 1849. Introduced by Eduard März. Vienna: Europaverlag, 1976. 
 1992 Untertan und Staat in Galizien : die Reformen unter Maria Theresia und Joseph II. Mainz: Von Zabern, 1992.
 1979 Zur nationalen Frage. Friedrich Engels und das Problem der 'geschichtslosen' Völker, Verlag Olle & Wolter, Berlin 1979, .

Writing in Italian 
 2007 "La situazione rivoluzionaria in Austria nel 1918 e la politica dei socialdemocratici", in: Antonio Moscato (ed.), Trockij e le pace necessaria: 1918, la socialdemocrazia e la tragedia russa. Argo: 2007.

Writing in Polish 
 1962 "Do historij "Krawego Roku" 1846". In: Kwartalnik Historyczny, pp. 403–321, 1958.
 1962 Stosunki poddańcze w dawnej Galicji. Warsaw, Paňstwowe Wydawnictwo Naukowe, 1962.
 1962 ""Spowied" Goslara." In: Kwartalnik Historyczny, 1962.
 1969 "Do historij "Sojuzu vyzvolennja Ukrajny"". In: Ukrajan'kik Samostijnik, 1969 et seq. pp. 31-40, pp. 29-35, pp. 38-42, pp. 33-39; pp. 26-30; pp. 32-39.

Writing in Ukrainian 
 1927 (Pseudonym T. Prokopovych) "Fridrych Engel's pro Ukrajinu". In: Chervonyj Shliakh, pp. 161–186, 1927, Nr. 7-8
 1951 "Do istorii ukrains'koho livo-sotsiialistychnoho rukhu v Halychyni (Pidchasvoienni 'Drahomanivky' 1916-18 r.r.),". In: Vpered, 1951, Nr. 3-4.

About Roman Rosdolsky 
 Ernest Mandel, "Roman Rosdolsky (1898-1967)", Quatrième Internationale, 33 (April 1968). English translation: "Roman Rosdolsky - a genuine Marxist scholar", Intercontinental Press (New York), 6, 21: 512-514, 3 June 1968. Dutch translation: "Wie was Roman Rosdolsky" (obituary)
 Obituary of Emily Rosdolsky 
 Janusz Radziejowski, "Roman Rosdolsky: man, activist a scholar", in: Science & Society, Vol. 42 (1978) Nr. 2, pp. 198–210 (provides biographical details). 
Anson G. Rabinbach, "Roman Rosdolsky 1897-1967: an introduction". New German Critique, No. 3, Autumn 1974, pp. 56–61.
 Ralph Melvile 1992, 'Roman Rosdolsky (1898-1967) als Historiker Galiziens und der Habsburgermonarchie', in: Roman Rosdolsky, Untertan und Staat in Galizien. Die Reformen unter Maria Theriasia und Joseph II, Mainz: Von Zabern: VII-XXV. 
 "On Roman Rosdolsky as a Guide to the Politics of the Neue Rheinische Zeitung", Science & Society, Vol. 63, Nr 2, pp. 235–241 
 Review of Roman Rosdolsky, Engels and the `Nonhistoric' Peoples. 
 Raya Dunayevskaya, A Critique of Roman Rosdolsky: Rosdolsky's Methodology and the Missing Dialectic 
 Paul Mattick, Roman Rosdolsky: Das symbolische Schicksal eines osteuropäischen Marxisten 
 Manfred A. Turban, "Roman Rosdolsky's Reconsideration of the Traditional Marxist Debate on the Schemes of Reproduction on New Methodological Grounds", in Koropeckyj, I. S., ed. Selected Contributions of Ukrainian Scholars to Economics. Harvard Ukrainian Research Institute Sources and Documents series. Cambridge, Mass.: Harvard Ukrainian Research Institute distributed by Harvard University Press, 1984, pages 91–134. 
 John Paul Himka, "Roman Rosdolsky's Reconsideration of the Traditional Marxist Debate on the Schemes of Reproduction on New Methodological Grounds: Comments", in Koropeckyj, I. S., ed. Selected Contributions of Ukrainian Scholars to Economics. Harvard Ukrainian Research Institute Sources and Documents series. Cambridge, Mass.: Harvard Ukrainian Research Institute distributed by Harvard University Press, 1984, pages 135-47.
 João Antonio de Paula, "Roman Rosdolsky (1898-1967): um intelectual em tempos de extremos". Nova Economia, vol.17, n.2, 2007. 
 Anson G. Rabinbach, "Roman Rosdolsky 1897-1967: An Introduction". New German Critique, No. 3 (Autumn, 1974), pp. 56–61.

References

External links 
 Roman Rosdolsky Archive at marxists.org
 International Institute of Social History, A description of the Rosdolsky archives
 Wikiversity Rosdolsky reading circle (Vienna)

See also 
 Emily Rosdolsky (de) :de:Emily Rosdolsky

1898 births
1967 deaths
Academic staff of the University of Lviv
Ukrainian anti-capitalists
Ukrainian Trotskyists
Ukrainian Marxists
Marxist theorists
Marxian economists
Ukrainian Austro-Hungarians
People from the Kingdom of Galicia and Lodomeria 
Austrian people of Ukrainian descent
Ukrainian revolutionaries
Communist Party of Western Ukraine members
Soviet Marxist historians
Politicians from Lviv
Critics of political economy